Maman may refer to:
 Maman, East Azerbaijan (ممان - Mamān)
 Maman, Kurdistan (مامن - Māman)